Cedar Glen West is an unincorporated community and census-designated place (CDP) located within Manchester Township, in Ocean County, New Jersey, United States. As of the 2010 United States Census, the CDP's population was 1,267.

Geography
According to the United States Census Bureau, the CDP had a total area of 1.070 square miles (2.772 km2), including 1.059 square miles (2.743 km2) of land and 0.011 square miles (0.029 km2) of water (1.06%). Situated between Ridgeway Boulevard and Ridgeway Road (County Route 571) in the northern part of the township, most of the area consists of the private Cedar Glen West Inc. private residential park comprising smaller one-story single family homes. A mobile home park and other scattered homes are located in the CDP as well.

Demographics

Census 2010

Census 2000
As of the 2000 United States Census there were 1,376 people, 914 households, and 337 families living in the CDP. The population density was 487.4/km2 (1,265.8/mi2). There were 1,015 housing units at an average density of 359.5/km2 (933.7/mi2). The racial makeup of the CDP was 97.67% White, 1.38% African American, 0.15% Native American, 0.07% Asian, and 0.73% from two or more races. Hispanic or Latino of any race were 0.94% of the population.

There were 914 households, out of which 3.4% had children under the age of 18 living with them, 31.1% were married couples living together, 5.1% had a female householder with no husband present, and 63.1% were non-families. 60.2% of all households were made up of individuals, and 50.9% had someone living alone who was 65 years of age or older. The average household size was 1.51 and the average family size was 2.28.

In the CDP the population was spread out, with 5.0% under the age of 18, 1.4% from 18 to 24, 7.4% from 25 to 44, 18.0% from 45 to 64, and 68.2% who were 65 years of age or older. The median age was 73 years. For every 100 females, there were 57.1 males. For every 100 females age 18 and over, there were 54.1 males.

The median income for a household in the CDP was $21,840, and the median income for a family was $34,583. Males had a median income of $31,313 versus $29,583 for females. The per capita income for the CDP was $19,548. None of the families and 8.1% of the population were living below the poverty line, including no under eighteens and 9.0% of those over 64.

References

Census-designated places in Ocean County, New Jersey
Manchester Township, New Jersey
Populated places in the Pine Barrens (New Jersey)